Problems is an Australian television comedy series starring Sam Simmons. The series premiered on 21 November 2012 on ABC.

Cast
 Sam Simmons as Sam
 Lawrence Mooney as Mooney
 Ronny Chieng as Mr Meowgi
 Anthony Morgan as Morgan
 Claudia O'Doherty as Claudia
 David Quirk as Dave
 Gary Sweet as Mr Moth
 Susie Porter as Mrs Moth
 Reg Gorman as Ron
 Doug Bayne as Brian
 Kate McCartney
 Laura Hughes

Episodes
 Episode 1: Taco Night 
 Episode 2: Bus Crush 
 Episode 3: First Hot Day 
 Episode 4: The Cardboard Angel

See also
List of Australian television series
List of Australian Broadcasting Corporation programs

References

External links
 Official ABC site
 

2012 Australian television series debuts
2012 Australian television series endings
Australian Broadcasting Corporation original programming
Australian comedy television series